The Winema Theater is a historic wooden theater building in the lumber town of Scotia, California. Built in a rustic style with redwood logs, it was designed by San Francisco architect Alfred Henry Jacobs and built in 1919. The first show was held in 1920. It was renovated in 2002. A historic marker is outside the theater. It has a gabled roof and a colonnade of redwood logs.

References

Theatres in California
Theatres completed in 1919
1919 establishments in California
Buildings and structures in Humboldt County, California